PivotPoint Technology Corporation is a software and systems engineering services company headquartered in Fallbrook, California. PivotPoint was founded in 2003 by Cris Kobryn, a noted expert in visual modeling languages and model-driven development technologies. PivotPoint is best known for its model-driven development consulting and training services, the latter which feature UML, SysML, BPMN and DoDAF workshops. PivotPoint is a founding member and a major contributor to the SysML Partners, the group of software tool vendors and industry leaders that convened in 2003 to create a UML dialect for systems engineering called SysML (Systems Modeling Language). In June 2007 the SysML Partners were named a winner in the Modeling category of the SD Times 100, which recognizes the leaders and innovators of the software development industry.

References

External links
 PivotPoint Technology corporate web

Software companies based in California
Engineering companies of the United States
SysML Partners
Companies based in San Diego County, California
Systems Modeling Language
Software companies of the United States